Salmon University is a recreational fishing website that provides news, instruction, and other information related to angling in Alaska, British Columbia, Oregon, and Washington. The site was launched in 2002.

References

External links

American news websites
Recreational fishing in the United States